Isolona zenkeri is a species of plant in the Annonaceae family. It is found in Cameroon, The Republic of the Congo and Gabon. Adolf Engler, the German botanist who first formally described the species, named it after Georg August Zenker who collected the sample Engler examined. Its natural habitat is subtropical or tropical moist lowland forests. It is threatened by habitat loss.

Description
It has dark smooth branches.  Its leaves are 20-25 by 7-9 centimeters and come to a point at their tip.</ref>

References

zenkeri
Vulnerable plants
Taxonomy articles created by Polbot
Flora of Cameroon
Flora of the Republic of the Congo
Flora of Gabon